Pseudovenanides is a genus of braconid wasps in the family Braconidae. There is at least one described species in Pseudovenanides, P. hunanus, found in China.

References

Microgastrinae